James, Jim, or Jimmy Barnes may refer to:

Politics

James Barnes (Canadian politician) (1842–?), farmer, lumberman, railway contractor and political figure in New Brunswick, Canada
James M. Barnes (politician) (1899–1958), U.S. Representative from Illinois
James Strachey Barnes (1890–1955), British Fascist Party member and diarist
Sir Jim Barnes (politician) (1908–1995), New Zealand politician

Sport
James Barnes (cricketer) (1886–1963), English cricketer
Jim Barnes (1886–1966), English professional golfer
Jim Barnes (offensive guard), American football player
Jim Barnes (American football, born 1959), American football player and coach
Jim "Bad News" Barnes (1941–2002), American basketball player

The arts
James Barnes (author) (1866–1936), American author
James Barnes (composer) (born 1949), American composer
James Barnes (television director) (born 1979), English television director
Jim Barnes (writer) (born 1933), Native American writer
Jimmy Barnes (born 1956), Scottish-Australian rock musician

Other people
Sir James Barnes (civil servant) (1891–1969), English civil servant
James Barnes (general) (1801–1869), American railroad executive and Union Army general in the American Civil War
James Barnes Wyngaarden (born 1924–2019), American medical researcher
James William Barnes Steveni (1859–1944), British correspondent in Russia
A. James Barnes (born 1942), American attorney, dean and professor
James Barnes, convicted murderer, interviewed in prison by Werner Herzog
James Stevenson Barnes (1756–1823), British colonel who served in the Napoleonic Wars
James Antonio Barnes (born 1944), American serial killer

Characters
Bucky Barnes also known as James Barnes, sidekick of Captain America and inheritor of the name

Other
James B. Barnes House, a historic site in Cambridge, Massachusetts